Rudolf Hilf (1 March 1923, Aš, Czechoslovakia – 20 April 2011, Hamburg, Germany) was a German historian, political scientist and expelled politician.

Life 
Hilf, born in 1923, served as a soldier in the Luftwaffe between 1942 and 1945. After the end of the war, his family was expelled from their homeland and settled down in Bavaria. He studied history at the University of Munich, and, in 1951, advanced onto political science. From 1960 to 1966, he was the private secretary of Prince Max Egon von Hohenlohe-Langenburg, a representative of the Bohemian Hochadels. From 1967 to 1973, he was managing director of the national association of the Federation of Expellees. After that, he was a speaker at the Bavarian State Center for Political Education until his retirement in 1988. From 1995 until his death, he has been a member of the Sudeten German Council and the executive committee of the Bavarian State Group of the Sudetendeutsche Landsmannschaft.

In 1977, together with Josef Stingl, the former President of the Federal Labor Office, Felix Ermacora,  and others, he founded the International Institute of Nationality Law and Regionalism (Intereg). He was also the initiator of the German-Czech cross-border region "Euregio Egrensis", founded shortly after 1990. He was also an author of many books, studies, and articles.

Awards 

 Honorary citizenship of the city of Aš (1993)
 Sudetendeutscher Kulturpreis (2006)

References

External links 
 
 Lebenslauf auf sudeten.de (PDF; 25 KB)

1923 births
2011 deaths
People from Aš
Sudeten German people
German politicians
German political scientists
Luftwaffe personnel of World War II